The Mumbai–Pune Expressway (officially Yashwantrao Chavan Expressway) is India's first 6-lane wide concrete, access-controlled tolled expressway. It spans a distance of 94.5 km connecting Mumbai, the capital of Maharashtra state and the financial capital of India, with Pune, the cultural and educational capital of Maharashtra. The expressway, which was fully operationalized in 2002, introduced new levels of speed and safety in automobile transportation to Indian roads. It is one of India's busiest roads.

The expressway starts at Kalamboli in Navi Mumbai and ends at Kiwale in Pune. It cleaves through the scenic Sahyadri mountain ranges through passes and tunnels. It has five interchanges: Kon (Shedung), Chowk, Khalapur, Kusgaon and Talegaon. The expressway has two carriageways, each with three concrete lanes, separated by a central divider and a tarmac or concrete shoulder on either side. Pedestrians, two-wheelers, three-wheelers, bullock carts and tractors are not permitted, although tractor-trailers (semi-trailer rigs) are permitted. Vehicles are also prohibited from halting on the expressway. The expressway handles about 43,000 PCUs daily, and is designed to handle up to 1,00,000 PCUs.

The expressway has reduced the travel time from Kalamboli in Mumbai to Kiwale in Pune to about two hours. It has largely supplemented the Mumbai-Pune section of NH 48 which had become extremely congested and accident-prone. 

The expressway is not part of NHAI highway network NH 48 and has been built, operated and maintained wholly by the Government of Maharashtra via Maharashtra State Road Development Corporation. NH 48 is another separate older national highway. The NH 48 merges with this expressway for a short distance near Khandala. Due to the winding route taken as the road climbs up the hills, traffic congestion occurs on that part of expressway where NH 48 merges. To alleviate this, a 'missing link' (bypass) project is under construction. This will allow traffic to bypass the hill (ghat) section, reducing the distance by about 6 km and travel time by an estimated 25 minutes.

History

The government of Maharashtra appointed RITES in 1990 to carry out feasibility studies for the new expressway to be operated on toll basis.

The government of Maharashtra entrusted the work of the construction of the expressway to MSRDC in March 1997 on Build-Operate-Transfer basis with permission to collect toll for 30 years. The Ministry of Environment and Forests, Government of India gave environmental clearance on 13 October 1997 and forest clearance on 11 November 1997.

The tender notice was published in leading newspapers all over India and also on the Internet. Due to the wide publicity, 133 tenders were sold and 55 tenders were received on 18 December 1997. After technical and financial evaluation, work orders were given on 1 January 1998 to four contractors. Thereafter tenders for widening of Khandala and Lonavala-Khandala bypass works were invited. The tenders were received on 24 August 1998 and orders were issued on 4 September 1998.

This six-lane project was completed under the stewardship of the Maharashtra State Road Development Corporation (MSRDC). The expressway cost  to construct. The first sections opened in 2000, and the entire route was completed, opened to traffic and made fully operational from April 2002. The entire length of expressway has a single layer of barbed wire fencing to keep out stray animals.

Naming
The expressway was conceived in the year 1990 when Indian National Congress governed Maharashtra. Eventually, in 2009, the then ruling coalition (INC, NCP) named the expressway after the first Chief Minister of Maharashtra, Yashavantrao Chavan, who was a member of the Congress.

Opening

The expressway was opened to public in April 2002. The expressway initially opened without a posted speed limit.

Tunnels

It has six illuminated, ventilated tunnels totaling 5,724 metres. These tunnels were built by the Konkan Railway Corporation Ltd.

Distances

Toll plazas

Toll is collected at Khalapur (Pali Phata) (for the Mumbai-Pune direction) and at Talegaon (for the Pune-Mumbai direction). The toll collection data is kept as secret as per the RTI inquiry raised by activist Vivek Velankar. The expressway contract with the Ideal Road Builders (IRB) has been uploaded but the toll collection details are not there. There is no plan to give toll waiver for this expressway.

Accidents and Incidents
The expressway has witnessed a large number of road accidents, attributed to human errors and the large volume of traffic. In the first 10 years since its opening, there were 1,758 accidents with more than 400 fatalities.
 On 28 May 2012, 27 people were reported to have died and another 26 injured in a road accident when a speeding tempo hit a stationary bus carrying passengers near Khalapur. 
 On 10 June 2010, at least 10 people were injured and 30 vehicles were damaged in a pileup near Kamshet which occurred when a MSRTC bus skidded inside a tunnel.

The heavy rains in June and July 2015 caused heavy landslides at Khandala and Adoshi tunnels, which prompted the PWD to remove loose rocks to prevent further landslides. To carry out such works, the expressway near to the Lonavala exit till Khopoli exit was closed from 10 am to 5 pm for 10 days after the landslide near Adoshi tunnel on 18 July 2015 which took three lives and halted the traffic for two months. The boulders fell on both carriageways which caused huge diversion of traffic towards the old highway.

Sporadic instances of robbery have been reported on the highway.

SaveLIFE Foundation, with support from Mahindra & Mahindra Ltd. and the MSRDC, initiated the 'Zero Fatality Corridor' project to make the expressway fatality-free by 2020. Since August 2016, over a thousand engineering errors on the expressway have been fixed. As a part of this project, the 'Safety Under 80' campaign was also jointly launched by SLF, MSRDC and Mahindra & Mahindra Ltd. The initiative aimed at creating mass awareness on the dangers of speeding and the consequences of speeding were exhibited through outdoor hoardings and installation of crashes cars on both the corridors of the expressway.

On 6 April 2020, during the lockdown during COVID-19, a section of the 190 year old Amrutanjan Bridge, a popular out of use railway bridge on the Bhor Ghat, was demolished by the MSRDC with the help of Maharashtra Police Highway Traffic department. The bridge was a major bottleneck on the ghat section, which caused traffic snarls and posed a safety issue for wide vehicles and trucks carrying wide goods. Post demolition, the safety and flow of traffic through the ghat section has improved.

Future expansion

MSRDC is planning to widen the expressway from current 6 lane to 8 lane. The proposal has been presented in Maharashtra Cabinet for approval.

See also
Expressways in India
Amritsar-Jamnagar Expressway
Delhi-Mumbai Expressway
Pune-Bengaluru Expressway

References

External links

MSRDC – Mumbai Pune Expressway Project

Transport in Mumbai
Transport in Pune
Expressways in Maharashtra
Toll roads in India
Road tunnels in Maharashtra